James Sutton (born 20 October 1985 in London) is a racing driver. He won the 2007 Porsche Carrera Cup GB.

Early years
Before he embarked on a career in cars, Sutton raced in karting, winning the London Cup in 2000 before becoming the Junior TKM British champion in 2001, before moving onto Formula ICA and in 2003 racing in the British Formula A karting championships.

Single Seaters 
Sutton's single-seater career began in 2004 where he won two races in the Formula BMW championships for the Fortec Motorsport team. In the same year Sutton became an accepted member of the British Racing Drivers' Club (BRDC), as a 'Rising Star'. Sutton stayed with the team where he won his first Formula Renault race at the opening round of the 2006 Formula Renault UK series at Brands Hatch.

In 2006 and 2005, competed in the Formula Renault championships for Fortec winning the opening race of the 2006 season.

Sutton is campaigning for the introduction of guidelines, to be subjected to racing drivers involved in high speed racing crashes, that would regulate and control drivers competing and/or driving on the public highway.

Porsche Carrera Cup Great Britain
In February 2007, it was announced that Sutton will compete in the Porsche Carrera Cup GB series for the 2007 season, with the Redline Racing team, which took Richard Westbrook to the championship in 2004 and took Danny Watts to 10 wins out of the 20 races in 2006.

On 25 August 2007, Sutton was interviewed by Muriel Gray for the BBC Radio 4 show, Saturday Live, describing how he has tried to come to terms with having been responsible for a road death.

In October 2007, Sutton won the Porsche Carrera Cup GB championship in his debut season, making him the youngest driver to win the series. Having required only two sensible race finishes prior to the final weekend, Sutton was involved in a controversial penultimate race that opened the championship up to 3 drivers (himself, Steven Kane and Tim Harvey). Requiring only a 3rd-place finish, Sutton, having started 7th on the grid, managed to the secure a podium finish and with that the overall title.

In November 2007, in an interview at the TOCA Awards ceremony, Sutton stated that an early retirement from motorsport had previously been contemplated at the end of the 2006 Formula Renault season. In an interview of the January 2008 edition of the 911 and Porsche World magazine, he stated that he chose to turn to sportscar racing when he was unable to raise the £400,000 needed to compete in F3. At this stage he had no definite 2008 plans.

Sutton returned to the series in 2009, enjoying further success, and despite missing the first round of the championship, found himself challenging Harvey and Tim Bridgman for the title. A succession of double wins at Silverstone and Rockingham (boosted by non-finishes for both Tims in race 2 at Silverstone) left him 4 points behind Harvey and 4 ahead of Bridgman going into the final meeting at Brands Hatch.

James went back to the Porsche Carrera Cup Championship in 2011 and following a hard fought season against his team mate, Michael Meadows, won for the second time. Michael Meadows suffered a slow puncture in the last race at Brands Hatch which led to James Sutton securing his title. James is quoted saying "it was a very tough season and I consider this the biggest achievement of my career so far, based purely on the people I've had to compete against. To finally come away with the title feels fantastic. We had to work hard to make this year happen in the first place."

James took a break from racing in 2012 before rejoining Redline in the Porsche Carrera Cup for the final three weekends of the 2012 championship replacing Glynn Geddie

British GT
In February 2008, Sutton was announced as the fourth driver to be signed for the newly formed CR Scuderia. James partnered Michael Meadows for the whole of the 2008 British GT season.

Whilst competing in the British GT, Sutton also raced once in the Porsche Super Cup at Silverstone (starting 19th on the grid to finish 4th), and the Spa 24-hour race of the FIA GT championship (alongside Andrew Kirkaldy, Rob Bell and Dirk Müller in the CR Scuderia no. 56 car).

Racing record

Complete Porsche Supercup results
(key) (Races in bold indicate pole position – 2 points awarded 2008 onwards in all races) (Races in italics indicate fastest lap)

‡ – Guest driver – Not eligible for points.

Complete British GT results
(key) (Races in bold indicate pole position) (Races in italics indicate fastest lap)

References

External links
'

1985 births
Living people
Sportspeople from London
English racing drivers
Dutch Formula Renault 2.0 drivers
British Formula Renault 2.0 drivers
Formula BMW UK drivers
British GT Championship drivers
Porsche Supercup drivers
24 Hours of Spa drivers
Porsche Carrera Cup GB drivers
CRS Racing drivers
Fortec Motorsport drivers